Gina Chrisanthopolous, known by her stage name Little G, is an Australian rapper, actress, dancer, and community activist.

She has performed at the Big Day Out, Songlines Music Festival and the Royal Melbourne Show and appeared in plays such as  Scratchin''' and DiaTribe'' and presented a hip-hop showcase for National Indigenous Television.

References

Year of birth missing (living people)
1980s births
Living people
Australian women rappers
Indigenous Australian musicians
Australian people of Greek descent
Australian female dancers
21st-century Australian actresses
Australian activists
21st-century Australian singers
People from Mildura
Indigenous Australians in Victoria (Australia)
Actresses from Victoria (Australia)
Singers from Victoria (Australia)